Ayutthaya Wittayalai School (A.Y.W.) is a school in Thailand, established in March 1905 by H.M. the King Chulalongkorn's region.

History

Buildings and landmarks in Ayutthaya Wittayalai School 

Statue of King Ananda Mahidol (King Rama VIII)
Building 1 (Sirimongkalananda Building)
Building 2
Building 3
Building 4
Building 5 (Queen Sirikit 60th Anniversary Building)
Building 6
Building 7 (Boonprasert Building)
Building 8 (Anandasilpa Building)
Building 9 (Ayutthaya Wittayalai's 100th Anniversary Building)
Building 10
Building 11 (Hana Building)
Building 12 (Aksarananda Building)
Subabhibhat Building
Tishyaraksha Building
Information Building
Industrial and Home Economics Center
Agricultural Center
King Rama VIII Hall
Hall 2
Dome 1
Dome 2 (Indoor Stadium)
Dome 3 (Indoor Stadium)
Dome 4
Takraw Gym
Football Field
Ayutthaya Wittayalai's Sport Center
Ayutthaya Wittayalai's Swimming Pool
Ayutthaya Wittayalai's 100th Anniversary Wall

List of directors

Alumni 
Statesman of Thailand
Pridi Banomyong or Luang Praditmanutham

Prime Ministers of Thailand
Pridi Banomyong or Luang Praditmanutham
Thawan Thamrongnawasawat or Luang Thamrongnawasawat

Supreme Patriarch of Thailand
Jinavajiralongkorn or Ariyavangsagatayana VIII (Vasana Vāsano)

Others

Curriculum
Programs
Junior High School

 Enrichment Program of Science, Mathematics, Technology, and Environment (SMTE)
 English Program
 Science-Mathematics Program
 Mathematics-English Program
 Science-Mathematics Program
 Mathematics-Languages Program
 ฺBasic Education Program
Senior High School
Enrichment Program of Science, Mathematics, Technology, and Environment (SMTE)
Science-Mathematics Program
English-Mathematics Program
English-Japanese Program
English-Chinese Program
English-French Program
English-Korean Program
Thai-Social Studies Program
Computer Graphics Program
Physical Education Program

1905 establishments in Siam
Schools in Thailand
Phra Nakhon Si Ayutthaya province